The 2019 Samarkand Challenger was a professional tennis tournament played on clay courts. It was the 23rd edition of the tournament which was part of the 2019 ATP Challenger Tour. It took place in Samarkand, Uzbekistan between 13 and 19 May 2019.

Singles main-draw entrants

Seeds

 1 Rankings are as of May 6, 2019.

Other entrants
The following players received wildcards into the singles main draw:
  Sergey Fomin
  Andrey Golubev
  Temur Ismailov
  Olimjon Nabiev
  Dmitry Popko

The following players received entry into the singles main draw using their ITF World Tennis Ranking:
  Sanjar Fayziev
  Karim-Mohamed Maamoun
  Emil Ruusuvuori
  Peter Torebko
  Alexander Zhurbin

The following player received entry into the singles main draw as an alternate:
  Fabrizio Ornago

The following players received entry from the qualifying draw:
  Vladyslav Manafov
  Evgenii Tiurnev

Champions

Singles

 João Menezes def.  Corentin Moutet 7–6(7–2), 7–6(9–7).

Doubles

 Gonçalo Oliveira /  Andrei Vasilevski def.  Sergey Fomin /  Teymuraz Gabashvili 3–6, 6–3, [10–4].

References

2019 ATP Challenger Tour
2019
2019 in Uzbekistani sport
May 2019 sports events in Asia